Dante Alighieri (– 14 September 1321), probably baptized Durante di Alighiero degli Alighieri and often referred to as Dante, was an Italian poet, writer and philosopher. His Divine Comedy, originally called  (modern Italian: Commedia) and later christened  by Giovanni Boccaccio, is widely considered one of the most important poems of the Middle Ages and the greatest literary work in the Italian language.

Dante is known for establishing the use of the vernacular in literature at a time when most poetry was written in Latin, which was accessible only to educated readers. His De vulgari eloquentia (On Eloquence in the Vernacular) was one of the first scholarly defenses of the vernacular. His use of the Florentine dialect for works such as The New Life (1295) and Divine Comedy helped establish the modern-day standardized Italian language. His work set a precedent that important Italian writers such as Petrarch and Boccaccio would later follow.

Dante was instrumental in establishing the literature of Italy. His depictions of Hell, Purgatory and Heaven provided inspiration for the larger body of Western art and literature. He influenced English writers such as Geoffrey Chaucer, John Milton and Alfred Tennyson, among many others. In addition, the first use of the interlocking three-line rhyme scheme, or the terza rima, is attributed to him.

Early life

Dante was born in Florence, Republic of Florence, in what is now Italy. The exact date of his birth is unknown, although it is generally believed to be around 1265. This can be deduced from autobiographic allusions in the Divine Comedy. Its first section, the Inferno, begins, "Nel mezzo del cammin di nostra vita" ("Midway upon the journey of our life"), implying that Dante was around 35 years old, since the average lifespan according to the Bible (Psalm 89:10, Vulgate) is 70 years; and since his imaginary travel to the netherworld took place in 1300, he was most probably born around 1265. Some verses of the Paradiso section of the Divine Comedy also provide a possible clue that he was born under the sign of Gemini: "As I revolved with the eternal twins, I saw revealed, from hills to river outlets, the threshing-floor that makes us so ferocious" (XXII  151–154). In 1265, the sun was in Gemini between approximately 11 May and 11 June (Julian calendar).

Dante claimed that his family descended from the ancient Romans (Inferno, XV, 76), but the earliest relative he could mention by name was Cacciaguida degli Elisei (Paradiso, XV, 135), born no earlier than about 1100. Dante's father, Alighiero di Bellincione, was a White Guelph who suffered no reprisals after the Ghibellines won the Battle of Montaperti in the middle of the 13th century. This suggests that Alighiero or his family may have enjoyed some protective prestige and status, although some suggest that the politically inactive Alighiero was of such low standing that he was not considered worth exiling.

Dante's family was loyal to the Guelphs, a political alliance that supported the Papacy and that was involved in complex opposition to the Ghibellines, who were backed by the Holy Roman Emperor. The poet's mother was Bella, probably a member of the Abati family. She died when Dante was not yet ten years old. His father Alighiero soon married again, to Lapa di Chiarissimo Cialuffi. It is uncertain whether he really married her, since widowers were socially limited in such matters, but she definitely bore him two children, Dante's half-brother Francesco and half-sister Tana (Gaetana).

Dante said he first met Beatrice Portinari, daughter of Folco Portinari, when he was nine (she was eight), and he claimed to have fallen in love with her "at first sight", apparently without even talking with her. When he was 12, however, he was promised in marriage to Gemma di Manetto Donati, daughter of Manetto Donati, member of the powerful Donati family. Contracting marriages for children at such an early age was quite common and involved a formal ceremony, including contracts signed before a notary. Dante claimed to have seen Beatrice again frequently after he turned 18, exchanging greetings with her in the streets of Florence, though he never knew her well.

Years after his marriage to Gemma, he claims to have met Beatrice again; he wrote several sonnets to Beatrice but never mentioned Gemma in any of his poems. He refers to other Donati relations, notably Forese and Piccarda, in his Divine Comedy. The exact date of his marriage is not known; the only certain information is that, before his exile in 1301, he had fathered three children with Gemma (Pietro, Jacopo and Antonia).

Dante fought with the Guelph cavalry at the Battle of Campaldino (11 June 1289). This victory brought about a reformation of the Florentine constitution. To take part in public life, one had to enroll in one of the city's many commercial or artisan guilds, so Dante entered the Physicians' and Apothecaries' Guild. In the following years, his name is occasionally recorded as speaking or voting in the various councils of the republic. A substantial portion of minutes from such meetings in the years 1298–1300 was lost, however, so the true extent of Dante's participation in the city's councils is uncertain.

Education and poetry

Not much is known about Dante's education; he presumably studied at home or in a chapter school attached to a church or monastery in Florence. It is known that he studied Tuscan poetry and that he admired the compositions of the Bolognese poet Guido Guinizelli—in Purgatorio XXVI he characterized him as his "father"—at a time when the Sicilian School (Scuola poetica Siciliana), a cultural group from Sicily, was becoming known in Tuscany. He also discovered the Provençal poetry of the troubadours, such as Arnaut Daniel, and the Latin writers of classical antiquity, including Cicero, Ovid and especially Virgil.

Dante's interactions with Beatrice set an example of so-called courtly love, a phenomenon developed in French and Provençal poetry of prior centuries. Dante's experience of such love was typical, but his expression of it was unique. It was in the name of this love that Dante left his imprint on the dolce stil novo ("sweet new style", a term that Dante himself coined), and he would join other contemporary poets and writers in exploring never-before-emphasized aspects of love (Amore). Love for Beatrice (as Petrarch would express for Laura somewhat differently) would be his reason for writing poetry and for living, together with political passions. In many of his poems, she is depicted as semi-divine, watching over him constantly and providing spiritual instruction, sometimes harshly. When Beatrice died in 1290, Dante sought refuge in Latin literature. The Convivio chronicles his having read Boethius's De consolatione philosophiae and Cicero's De Amicitia.

He next dedicated himself to philosophical studies at religious schools like the Dominican one in Santa Maria Novella. He took part in the disputes that the two principal mendicant orders (Franciscan and Dominican) publicly or indirectly held in Florence, the former explaining the doctrines of the mystics and of St. Bonaventure, the latter expounding on the theories of St. Thomas Aquinas.

At 18, Dante met Guido Cavalcanti, Lapo Gianni, Cino da Pistoia and, soon after, Brunetto Latini; together they became the leaders of the dolce stil novo. Brunetto later received special mention in the Divine Comedy (Inferno, XV, 28) for what he had taught Dante: Nor speaking less on that account I go With Ser Brunetto, and I ask who are his most known and most eminent companions. Some fifty poetical commentaries by Dante are known (the so-called Rime, rhymes), others being included in the later Vita Nuova and Convivio. Other studies are reported, or deduced from Vita Nuova or the Comedy, regarding painting and music.

Florence and politics

Dante, like most Florentines of his day, was embroiled in the Guelph–Ghibelline conflict. He fought in the Battle of Campaldino (11 June 1289), with the Florentine Guelphs against Arezzo Ghibellines; then in 1294 he was among the escorts of Charles Martel of Anjou (grandson of Charles I of Anjou) while he was in Florence. To further his political career, he became a pharmacist. He did not intend to practice as one, but a law issued in 1295 required nobles aspiring to public office to be enrolled in one of the Corporazioni delle Arti e dei Mestieri, so Dante obtained admission to the Apothecaries' Guild. This profession was not inappropriate, since at that time books were sold from apothecaries' shops. As a politician, he accomplished little but held various offices over some years in a city rife with political unrest.

After defeating the Ghibellines, the Guelphs divided into two factions: the White Guelphs (Guelfi Bianchi)—Dante's party, led by Vieri dei Cerchi—and the Black Guelphs (Guelfi Neri), led by Corso Donati. Although the split was along family lines at first, ideological differences arose based on opposing views of the papal role in Florentine affairs. The Blacks supported the Pope and the Whites wanted more freedom from Rome. The Whites took power first and expelled the Blacks. In response, Pope Boniface VIII planned a military occupation of Florence. In 1301, Charles of Valois, brother of King Philip IV of France, was expected to visit Florence because the Pope had appointed him as peacemaker for Tuscany. But the city's government had treated the Pope's ambassadors badly a few weeks before, seeking independence from papal influence. It was believed that Charles had received other unofficial instructions, so the council sent a delegation that included Dante to Rome to ascertain the Pope's intentions.

Exile from Florence
Pope Boniface quickly dismissed the other delegates and asked Dante alone to remain in Rome. At the same time (1 November 1301), Charles of Valois entered Florence with the Black Guelphs, who in the next six days destroyed much of the city and killed many of their enemies. A new Black Guelph government was installed, and Cante dei Gabrielli da Gubbio was appointed podestà of the city. In March 1302, Dante, a White Guelph by affiliation, along with the Gherardini family, was condemned to exile for two years and ordered to pay a large fine. Dante was accused of corruption and financial wrongdoing by the Black Guelphs for the time that Dante was serving as city prior (Florence's highest position) for two months in 1300. The poet was still in Rome in 1302, as the Pope, who had backed the Black Guelphs, had "suggested" that Dante stay there. Florence under the Black Guelphs, therefore, considered Dante an absconder.

Dante did not pay the fine, in part because he believed he was not guilty and in part because all his assets in Florence had been seized by the Black Guelphs. He was condemned to perpetual exile; if he had returned to Florence without paying the fine, he could have been burned at the stake. (In June 2008, nearly seven centuries after his death, the city council of Florence passed a motion rescinding Dante's sentence.)

Dante took part in several attempts by the White Guelphs to regain power, but these failed due to treachery. Bitter at the treatment he received from his enemies, he grew disgusted with the infighting and ineffectiveness of his erstwhile allies and vowed to become a party of one. He went to Verona as a guest of Bartolomeo I della Scala, then moved to Sarzana in Liguria. Later he is supposed to have lived in Lucca with a woman named Gentucca. She apparently made his stay comfortable (and he later gratefully mentioned her in Purgatorio, XXIV, 37). Some speculative sources claim he visited Paris between 1308 and 1310, and other sources even less trustworthy say he went to Oxford: these claims, first made in Boccaccio's book on Dante several decades after his death, seem inspired by readers who were impressed with the poet's wide learning and erudition. Evidently, Dante's command of philosophy and his literary interests deepened in exile and when he was no longer busy with the day-to-day business of Florentine domestic politics, and this is evidenced in his prose writings in this period. There is no real evidence that he ever left Italy. Dante's Immensa Dei dilectione testante to Henry VII of Luxembourg confirms his residence "beneath the springs of Arno, near Tuscany" in March 1311.

In 1310, Holy Roman Emperor Henry VII of Luxembourg marched into Italy at the head of 5,000 troops. Dante saw in him a new Charlemagne who would restore the office of the Holy Roman Emperor to its former glory and also retake Florence from the Black Guelphs. He wrote to Henry and several Italian princes, demanding that they destroy the Black Guelphs. Mixing religion and private concerns in his writings, he invoked the worst anger of God against his city and suggested several particular targets, who were also his personal enemies. It was during this time that he wrote De Monarchia, proposing a universal monarchy under Henry VII.

At some point during his exile, he conceived of the Comedy, but the date is uncertain. The work is much more assured and on a larger scale than anything he had written in Florence; it is likely he would have undertaken such a work only after he realized his political ambitions, which had been central to him up to his banishment, had been halted for some time, possibly forever. It is also noticeable that Beatrice has returned to his imagination with renewed force and with a wider meaning than in the Vita Nuova; in Convivio (written c. 1304–07) he had declared that the memory of this youthful romance belonged to the past.

An early indication that the poem was underway is a notice by Francesco da Barberino, tucked into his Documenti d'Amore (Lessons of Love), probably written in 1314 or early 1315. Francesco notes that Dante followed the Aeneid in a poem called "Comedy" and that the setting of this poem (or part of it) was the underworld; i.e., hell. The brief note gives no incontestable indication that Barberino had seen or read even the Inferno, or that this part had been published at the time, but it indicates composition was well underway and that the sketching of the poem might have begun some years before. (It has been suggested that a knowledge of Dante's work also underlies some of the illuminations in Francesco da Barberino's earlier Officiolum [c. 1305–08], a manuscript that came to light in 2003.<ref>{{cite web|url=http://www.spolia.it/online/en/argomenti/letterature_romanze/filologia/2003/barberino.htm|title=LOfficiolum ritrovato di Francesco da Barberino|author=Fabio M. Bertolo|year= 2003|work=Spolia – Journal of Medieval Studies|access-date=18 August 2012}}</ref>) It is known that the Inferno had been published by 1317; this is established by quoted lines interspersed in the margins of contemporary dated records from Bologna, but there is no certainty as to whether the three parts of the poem were each published in full or, rather, a few cantos at a time. Paradiso seems to have been published posthumously.

In 1312 Henry assaulted Florence and defeated the Black Guelphs, but there is no evidence that Dante was involved. Some say he refused to participate in the attack on his city by a foreigner; others suggest that he had become unpopular with the White Guelphs, too, and that any trace of his passage had carefully been removed. Henry VII died (from a fever) in 1313 and with him any hope for Dante to see Florence again. He returned to Verona, where Cangrande I della Scala allowed him to live in certain security and, presumably, in a fair degree of prosperity. Cangrande was admitted to Dante's Paradise (Paradiso, XVII, 76).

During the period of his exile, Dante corresponded with Dominican theologian Fr. Nicholas Brunacci OP [1240–1322], who had been a student of Thomas Aquinas at the Santa Sabina studium in Rome, later at Paris, and of Albert the Great at the Cologne studium. Brunacci became lector at the Santa Sabina studium, forerunner of the Pontifical University of Saint Thomas Aquinas, and later served in the papal curia.

In 1315, Florence was forced by Uguccione della Faggiuola (the military officer controlling the town) to grant an amnesty to those in exile, including Dante. But for this, Florence required public penance in addition to payment of a high fine. Dante refused, preferring to remain in exile. When Uguccione defeated Florence, Dante's death sentence was commuted to house arrest, on condition that he go to Florence to swear he would never enter the town again. He refused to go, and his death sentence was confirmed and extended to his sons. He still hoped late in life that he might be invited back to Florence on honorable terms.

Death and burial

Dante's final days were spent in Ravenna, where he had been invited to stay in the city in 1318 by its prince, Guido II da Polenta. Dante died in Ravenna on 14 September 1321, aged about 56, of quartan malaria contracted while returning from a diplomatic mission to the Republic of Venice. He was attended by his three children, and possibly by Gemma Donati, and by friends and admirers he had in the city. He was buried in Ravenna at the Church of San Pier Maggiore (later called Basilica di San Francesco). Bernardo Bembo, praetor of Venice, erected a tomb for him in 1483.

On the grave, a verse of Bernardo Canaccio, a friend of Dante, is dedicated to Florence:

In 1329, Bertrand du Pouget, Cardinal and nephew of Pope John XXII, classified Dante's Monarchia as heretical and sought to have his bones burned at the stake. Ostasio I da Polenta and Pino della Tosa, allies of Pouget, interceded to prevent the destruction of Dante's remains.

Florence eventually came to regret having exiled Dante. The city made repeated requests for the return of his remains. The custodians of the body in Ravenna refused, at one point going so far as to conceal the bones in a false wall of the monastery. Florence built a tomb for Dante in 1829, in the Basilica of Santa Croce. That tomb has been empty ever since, with Dante's body remaining in Ravenna. The front of his tomb in Florence reads Onorate l'altissimo poeta — which roughly translates as "Honor the most exalted poet" and is a quote from the fourth canto of the Inferno.

In 1945, the fascist government discussed bringing Dante's remains to the Valtellina Redoubt, the Alpine valley in which the regime intended to make its last stand against the Allies. The case was made that "the greatest symbol of Italianness" should be present at fascism's "heroic" end.

A copy of Dante's so-called death mask has been displayed since 1911 in the Palazzo Vecchio; scholars today believe it is not a true death mask and was probably carved in 1483, perhaps by Pietro and Tullio Lombardo.

Legacy

The first formal biography of Dante was the Vita di Dante (also known as Trattatello in laude di Dante), written after 1348 by Giovanni Boccaccio. Although several statements and episodes of it have been deemed unreliable on the basis of modern research, an earlier account of Dante's life and works had been included in the Nuova Cronica of the Florentine chronicler Giovanni Villani.

Some 16th-century English Protestants, such as John Bale and John Foxe, argued that Dante was a proto-Protestant because of his opposition to the pope.

The 19th century saw a "Dante revival", a product of the medieval revival, which was itself an important aspect of Romanticism. Thomas Carlyle profiled him in "The Hero as Poet", the third lecture in On Heroes, Hero-Worship, & the Heroic in History (1841): "He is world-great not because he is worldwide, but because he is world-deep. . . . Dante is the spokesman of the Middle Ages; the Thought they lived by stands here, in everlasting music." Leigh Hunt, Henry Francis Cary and Henry Wadsworth Longfellow were among Dante's translators of the era.

Italy's first dreadnought battleship was completed in 1913 and named Dante Alighieri in honor of him.

On 30 April 1921, in honor of the 600th anniversary of Dante's death, Pope Benedict XV promulgated an encyclical named In praeclara summorum, naming Dante as one "of the many celebrated geniuses of whom the Catholic faith can boast" and the "pride and glory of humanity".

On 7 December 1965, Pope Paul VI promulgated the Latin motu proprio titled Altissimi cantus, which was dedicated to Dante's figure and poetry. In that year, the pope also donated a golden iron Greek Cross to Dante's burial site in Ravenna, in occasion of the 700th anniversary of his birth. The same cross was blessed by Pope Francis in October 2020.

In 2007, a reconstruction of Dante's face was undertaken in a collaborative project. Artists from Pisa University and forensic engineers at the University of Bologna at Forlì constructed the model, portraying Dante's features as somewhat different from what was once thought.

In 2008, the Municipality of Florence officially apologized for expelling Dante 700 years earlier.

A celebration was held in 2015 at Italy's Senate of the Republic for the 750th anniversary of Dante's birth. It included a commemoration from Pope Francis, who also issued the apostolic letter Cando lucis aeternae in honor of the anniversary.

In May 2021, a symbolic re-trial of Dante Alighieri was held virtually in Florence to posthumously clear his name.

Works

Overview
Most of Dante's literary work was composed after his exile in 1301. La Vita Nuova ("The New Life") is the only major work that predates it; it is a collection of lyric poems (sonnets and songs) with commentary in prose, ostensibly intended to be circulated in manuscript form, as was customary for such poems. It also contains, or constructs, the story of his love for Beatrice Portinari, who later served as the ultimate symbol of salvation in the Comedy, a function already indicated in the final pages of the Vita Nuova. The work contains many of Dante's love poems in Tuscan, which was not unprecedented; the vernacular had been regularly used for lyric works before, during all the thirteenth century. However, Dante's commentary on his own work is also in the vernacular—both in the Vita Nuova and in the Convivio—instead of the Latin that was almost universally used.

The Divine Comedy describes Dante's journey through Hell (Inferno), Purgatory (Purgatorio), and Paradise (Paradiso); he is first guided by the Roman poet Virgil and then by Beatrice. Of the books, Purgatorio is arguably the most lyrical of the three, referring to more contemporary poets and artists than Inferno; Paradiso is the most heavily theological, and the one in which, many scholars have argued, the Divine Comedys most beautiful and mystic passages appear.

With its seriousness of purpose, its literary stature and the range—both stylistic and thematic—of its content, the Comedy soon became a cornerstone in the evolution of Italian as an established literary language. Dante was more aware than most early Italian writers of the variety of Italian dialects and of the need to create a literature and a unified literary language beyond the limits of Latin writing at the time; in that sense, he is a forerunner of the Renaissance, with its effort to create vernacular literature in competition with earlier classical writers. Dante's in-depth knowledge (within the limits of his time) of Roman antiquity, and his evident admiration for some aspects of pagan Rome, also point forward to the 15th century. Ironically, while he was widely honored in the centuries after his death, the Comedy slipped out of fashion among men of letters: too medieval, too rough and tragic, and not stylistically refined in the respects that the high and late Renaissance came to demand of literature.

He wrote the Comedy in a language he called "Italian", in some sense an amalgamated literary language mostly based on the regional dialect of Tuscany, but with some elements of Latin and other regional dialects. He deliberately aimed to reach a readership throughout Italy including laymen, clergymen and other poets. By creating a poem of epic structure and philosophic purpose, he established that the Italian language was suitable for the highest sort of expression. In French, Italian is sometimes nicknamed la langue de Dante. Publishing in the vernacular language marked Dante as one of the first in Roman Catholic Western Europe (among others such as Geoffrey Chaucer and Giovanni Boccaccio) to break free from standards of publishing in only Latin (the language of liturgy, history and scholarship in general, but often also of lyric poetry). This break set a precedent and allowed more literature to be published for a wider audience, setting the stage for greater levels of literacy in the future. However, unlike Boccaccio, Milton or Ariosto, Dante did not really become an author read across Europe until the Romantic era. To the Romantics, Dante, like Homer and Shakespeare, was a prime example of the "original genius" who set his own rules, created persons of overpowering stature and depth, and went far beyond any imitation of the patterns of earlier masters; and who, in turn, could not truly be imitated. Throughout the 19th century, Dante's reputation grew and solidified; and by 1865, the 600th anniversary of his birth, he had become established as one of the greatest literary icons of the Western world.

New readers often wonder how such a serious work may be called a "comedy". In the classical sense the word comedy refers to works that reflect belief in an ordered universe, in which events tend toward not only a happy or amusing ending but one influenced by a Providential will that orders all things to an ultimate good. By this meaning of the word, as Dante himself allegedly wrote in a letter to Cangrande I della Scala, the progression of the pilgrimage from Hell to Paradise is the paradigmatic expression of comedy, since the work begins with the pilgrim's moral confusion and ends with the vision of God.

A number of other works are credited to Dante. Convivio ("The Banquet") is a collection of his longest poems with an (unfinished) allegorical commentary. Monarchia ("Monarchy") is a summary treatise of political philosophy in Latin which was condemned and burned after Dante's death by the Papal Legate Bertrando del Poggetto; it argues for the necessity of a universal or global monarchy to establish universal peace in this life, and this monarchy's relationship to the Roman Catholic Church as guide to eternal peace. De vulgari eloquentia ("On the Eloquence in the Vernacular") is a treatise on vernacular literature, partly inspired by the Razos de trobar of Raimon Vidal de Bezaudun. Quaestio de aqua et terra ("A Question of the Water and of the Land") is a theological work discussing the arrangement of Earth's dry land and ocean. The Eclogues are two poems addressed to the poet Giovanni del Virgilio. Dante is also sometimes credited with writing Il Fiore ("The Flower"), a series of sonnets summarizing Le Roman de la Rose, and Detto d'Amore ("Tale of Love"), a short narrative poem also based on Le Roman de la Rose. These would be the earliest, and most novice, of his known works. Le Rime is a posthumous collection of miscellaneous poems.

List of works
The major works of Dante's are the following.
 Il Fiore and Detto d'Amore ("The Flower" and "Tale of Love", 1283–7)
 La Vita Nuova ("The New Life", 1294)
 De vulgari eloquentia ("On the Eloquence in the Vernacular", 1302–5)
 Convivio ("The Banquet", 1307)
 Monarchia ("Monarchy", 1313)
 Divina Commedia ("Divine Comedy", 1320)
 Eclogues (1320)
 Quaestio de aqua et terra ("A Question of the Water and of the Land", 1320)
 Le Rime

Notes

Citations

References 
 
 
 Barolini, Teodolinda (ed.). ''Dante's Lyric Poetry: Poems of Youth and of the 'Vita Nuova. University of Toronto Press, 2014.
 
 
 
 
 
 
 
 
 
 
 
 
 Guénon, René (1925). The Esoterism of Dante, trans. by C.B. Berhill, in the Perennial Wisdom Series. Ghent, NY: Sophia Perennis et Universalis, 1996. viii, 72 p. N.B.: Originally published in French, entitled L'Esoterisme de Danté, in 1925. 

External links

 
 
 
 
 
 Works by Dante Alighieri at One More Library (Works in English, Italian, Latin, Arabic, German, French and Spanish)
 
 The Dante Museum in Florence: his life, his books and a history & literature blog about Dante
 The World of Dante multimedia, texts, maps, gallery, searchable database, music, teacher resources, timeline
 The Princeton Dante Project  texts and multimedia
 The Dartmouth Dante Project searchable database of commentary
 Dante Online manuscripts of works, images and text transcripts by Società Dantesca Italiana
 Digital Dante – Divine Comedy with commentary, other works, scholars on Dante
 Open Yale Course on Dante by Yale University
 DanteSources project about Dante's primary sources developed by ISTI-CNR and the University of Pisa
 Works Italian and Latin texts, concordances and frequency lists by IntraText
 Dante Today citings and sightings of Dante in contemporary culture
 Bibliotheca Dantesca journal dedicated to Dante and his reception
Edmund Garratt Gardner (1908). "Dante Alighieri". In Catholic Encyclopedia. 4. New York: Robert Appleton Company.
Arthur John Butler (1911). "Dante". In Chisholm, Hugh (ed.). Encyclopædia Britannica. 7.''' (11th ed.). Cambridge University Press. pp. 810–817.
Dante Collection at University College London (c. 3000 volumes of works by and about Dante)

 
1265 births
1321 deaths
13th-century Italian poets
13th-century Italian writers
14th-century Italian poets
14th-century Italian writers
14th-century Latin writers
14th-century people of the Republic of Florence
Apothecaries
Catholic poets
Christian writers
Culture in Florence
Demonologists
Epic poets
Italian exiles
Italian-language poets
Italian male poets
Italian political philosophers
Italian Roman Catholics
Latin-language writers from Italy
Medieval Latin poets
Politicians from Florence
Roman Catholic writers
Sonneteers
Writers from Florence